The Maxwell School of Citizenship and Public Affairs (Maxwell School) is the professional public policy school of Syracuse University, a private research university in Syracuse, New York. The school is organized in 11 academic departments and 13 affiliated research centers and offers coursework in the fields of public administration, international relations, foreign policy, political Science, science and technology policy, social sciences, and economics through its undergraduate (BA) degrees, graduate Master of Public Affairs (MPA), Master of Arts (MA), and PhD degrees.

The school has been recognized as one of the world's best graduate schools of public affairs. It awards the oldest public administration degree in the United States.

History

The school is named for George Holmes Maxwell, a Syracuse alumnus and Boston patent attorney who in 1924 donated $500,000 to the university to establish a school which would aim "to cull from every source those principles, facts, and elements which, combined, make up our rights and duties and our value and distinctiveness as United States citizens". Maxwell's initial interest was in training all undergraduates for their roles as informed citizens in the American democracy; University officials convinced him the school should also provide professional training for future government officials and other public servants.

The Maxwell School was dedicated on October 3, 1924, and was the first program to offer a graduate professional degree in public administration. That Master of Public Administration program is the oldest continuously operating, university-based MPA in the United States.

In 1937, the school took its full name and moved into Maxwell Hall, a purpose-built building on the west end of Syracuse University's main campus. In that year, Syracuse University's graduate programs and undergraduate instruction in the social sciences were moved into Maxwell, giving the school the unusual hybrid structure that remains today.

In 1968, Maxwell professor Dwight Waldo presided over the Minnowbrook I conference, which established the foundations for New Public Administration. Subsequent Minnowbrook II and III conferences were held in 1988 and 2008 at the eponymous Blue Mountain Lake retreat.

The school's rapid growth necessitated the 1990 "Campaign for Maxwell", which raised capital to fund a new building to accommodate the expansion. The Holden Observatory, built in 1887, was moved to create space for a new 5-story building. The result of the campaign was the Bohlin Cywinski Jackson-designed Eggers Hall, which opened in 1994. Eggers Hall adjoins Maxwell Hall at the corner, together forming an "L" shaped complex that houses the present-day Maxwell School.

In 2013, the Maxwell School and the Center for Strategic and International Studies, a think tank in Washington, D.C., entered into a collaborative agreement that included headquartering all Maxwell operations at CSIS.

Academics

Departments

 Anthropology
 Economics
 Executive Education
 Geography
 History
 International Relations
 Policy Studies
 Political Science
 Social Science
 Sociology

Research centers
The school hosts or co-hosts 13 research centers or institutes, encouraging interdisciplinary study and conversation within such broad rubrics as global affairs, domestic policy, conflict and collaboration, environmental studies, aging, public wellness, citizenship, and national security and counterterrorism.

 Autonomous Systems Policy Institute
Campbell Public Affairs Institute
 Center for Aging and Policy Studies (CAPS)
Center for Environmental Policy and Administration
Center for Policy Research: The CPR, established in 1994, houses the Metropolitan Studies, Aging Studies programs, the Lerner Center for Public Health Promotion, and the Upstate Health Research Network.
Center for Qualitative and Multi-Method Inquiry
Institute for the Study of the Judiciary, Politics, and the Media: Co-sponsored with Syracuse Law and the S.I. Newhouse School of Public Communications.
Maxwell X Lab: Started in 2017, the "X Lab" bridges the gap between university research and the public and non-profit sectors. The research leverages behavioral science and randomized controlled trials to build evidence for what works. Syracuse University alumnus Joseph Boskovski started the Maxwell X Lab with Professor Leonard Lopoo, then-director of the Center for Policy Research at Maxwell, in January 2017, according to an article by writer Edy Semaan on the school's official news website. The Maxwell X Lab has worked with the Lerner Center for Public Health Promotion, the City of Syracuse, the Early Childhood Alliance, and others, covering areas like healthcare and education.
Moynihan Institute of Global Affairs: Established 2005 and named for Daniel Patrick Moynihan, studies challenges to the quality of governance worldwide. 
Institute for Security Policy and Law, formerly known as the Institute for National Security and Counterterrorism

Joint and concurrent degrees
Master of Public Health, with SUNY Upstate Medical
Public Diplomacy, with the Newhouse School
Documentary Film and History, with the Newhouse School
 Masters in Public Administration with School of Advanced International Studies (SAIS) at Johns Hopkins University

Maxwell maintains formal relationships with a number of American and global institutions, among them the Chinese Academy of Governance, East China Normal University, Fudan University, the Hertie School of Governance, the Indian Institute of Management, Bangalore, the Korea Development Institute, the Korea Institute of Public Administration, Moscow State University, Seoul National University, and Tsinghua University.

Online programs

Online Executive Master of Public Administration Program 
The Maxwell School offers an online Executive Master of Public Administration degree for mid-career professionals. The curriculum requires 30 credits, includes live online classes and real-world learning opportunities, and can be completed in 15 months. Courses focus on mastery in leading and managing organizations with diverse stakeholders; formulating, implementing, and evaluating policy; and applying rigorous and evidence-based analysis to inform decision-making.

Rankings
Since 1995, the Maxwell School has been ranked the top graduate program for public affairs in the country in 11 out of the 12 times the rankings were administered by U.S. News & World Report. In 2022, the school ranked #1 in Public Management and Leadership, #2 in Nonprofit Management and Public Finance and Budgeting, #6 in the Environmental Policy and Management department, and six other sub-speciality ranked in the top 15.

In 2018, Foreign Policy magazine ranked the master's program in International Relations #16 in the world.

Notable alumni

Government and politics
 John R. Bass, US Ambassador to Georgia, Turkey, and Afghanistan (BA '86)
 John Berry, US Ambassador to Australia (MPA '81)
 David Bing, Mayor, City of Detroit (MS '06 & JD '06)
 Carolyn Bourdeaux, member, US House of Representatives (DPA '03)
 Andrew R. Ciesla, Senator, State of New Jersey (MPA '76)
 James B. Cunningham, Ambassador for Kabul, Afghanistan (BA '74)
 Benjamin Diokno, Professor Emeritus at the University of the Philippines Diliman School of Economics and Department of Budget and Management secretary of the Philippines, 1998-2001 and 2016–present (PhD '81)
 Kwabena Duffuor, Finance Minister of Ghana (MA '75)
 Robert Duffy, New York Lieutenant Governor (MPA '98)
 James E. Graves Jr., Federal Judge, United States Court of Appeals for the Fifth Circuit (MPA '81)
 Stanley L. Greigg, former member of the U.S. House of Representatives from northwestern Iowa (MPA '56)
 Ponatshego Kedikilwe, Vice President, Republic of Botswana (MPA '72)
 Stephanie Miner, Mayor, Syracuse, NY (BA '92)
 Mohammad Al Murr, Speaker, UAE Federal National Council (BA '78)
 Bismark Myrick, former Ambassador to Liberia (MA '73)
 Masahide Ota, Governor, Okinawa Prefecture (MA '56)
 Matt Rhoades, American political consultant and strategist for the Republican National Committee (MPA '00)
 Steve Rothman, member, US House of Representatives (BA '74)
 Salvador del Solar, former Prime Minister of Peru (MA '02)
 Donna Shalala, Member of the US House of Representatives and former Secretary of Health and Human Services (MPA '70 & PhD '70)
 Arun Shourie, Indian politician and civil servant (PhD '66 & MA '65)
 Lt. General Jay B. Silveria, twentieth Superintendent of the U.S. Air Force Academy. (MSS '97)
 Christine Varney, former Antitrust Officer Department of Justice (MPA '78)
 John P. White, Former Deputy Secretary, U.S. Department of Defense (PhD '69 & MPA '64)

Non-profit
Molly Corbett Broad, President, American Council on Education (BA '62)
 Marc S. Ellenbogen, President, Prague Society for International Cooperation and Chairman, Global Panel Foundation (MIR '85)
 Mark Emmert, President, NCAA (former President, University of Washington) (MPA '76, PhD '83)

Academia
 Walter Broadnax, former President, Clark Atlanta University (PhD '75)
 Kent John Chabotar, President, Guilford College (MPA '69 & PhD '73)
 Michael Crow, President, Arizona State University (PhD '85)
 A. Lee Fritschler,  President, Dickinson College (MPA'60 & PhD '65)
 Alice Stone Ilchman, President, Sarah Lawrence College (MPA'58)
 William M. LeoGrande, former Dean, American University School of International Service (BA '71 & MA '73)
Sean O'Keefe, University Professor at the Maxwell School; former CEO, Airbus Group, Inc. (former Administrator of NASA and former Chancellor, Louisiana State University) (MPA '79)
Joseph Rallo, former President, Angelo State University and Vice Chancellor, Texas Tech University (MA '78 & PhD '80)
James F. Rinehart, Dean, Troy University, College of Arts and Sciences (MS '91 & PhD '93)
Kenneth P. Ruscio, President, Washington and Lee University (MPA '78 & PhD '83)
 Mitchel B. Wallerstein, President, Baruch College (formerly 8th Dean of the Maxwell School of Citizenship and Public Affairs) (MPA '72)

Private sector
 Al-Waleed bin Talal, founder and CEO of Kingdom Holding Company, member of the Saudi Royal Family (MSSc '85)

References

External links 
 

1924 establishments in New York (state)
Educational institutions established in 1924
Public administration schools in the United States
Public policy schools
Schools of international relations in the United States
Syracuse University schools